Stackebrandtia nassauensis is a bacterium from the genus of Stackebrandtia which has been isolated from soil from a roadside from Nassau in Puerto Rico.

References

Further reading 
 
 

Actinomycetia
Bacteria described in 2005